Shi Hui (1915 – December 1957), born Shi Yutao, was a Chinese actor and film director who gained prominence throughout the 1940s through 1950s. Despite his fame, Shi became a victim of the Anti-Rightist Movement in the mid-1950s and committed suicide soon thereafter.

Career
Shi's career as an actor began relatively late. His first film was not until 1940's The Chaotic World (dir. Wu Renzhi), and he would not gain broad recognition until after the war, with a series of classic films including Phony Phoenixes (dir. Huang Zuolin) and Long Live the Missus! (dir. Sang Hu).  He also played the lead in Ai le zhongnian (The Joys and Sorrows of Middle Age), which is often ranked as one of the greatest Chinese films of all time.

After the Communist takeover, Shi became increasingly involved with the making of films behind the camera, directing himself in the classic This Life of Mine. Shi continued to direct throughout the early years of the 1950s, even gaining international attention with 1954's Letter with Feather, which won a prize at the Edinburgh Film Festival. The next year, he filmed a stage performance of a Chinese Opera in The Heavenly Match, which became a popular hit with audiences in Hong Kong. Shortly thereafter, however, Shi ran afoul with Communist authorities and was denounced during the Anti-Rightist Movement as a reactionary, leading eventually to his suicide by drowning in December 1957.

Filmography

As director

As actor

References

External links

Shi Hui at the Chinese Movie Database

1915 births
1957 deaths
Yaohua High School alumni
Tianjin Nankai High School alumni
Male actors from Tianjin
Chinese male stage actors
Film directors from Tianjin
Suicides in the People's Republic of China
20th-century Chinese male actors
Chinese male film actors
Chinese film directors
Victims of the Anti-Rightist Campaign
Suicides by drowning in China
1957 suicides